Katrín Ásbjörnsdóttir (born 11 December 1992) is an Icelandic footballer who plays as a midfielder for Stjarnan in the Úrvalsdeild kvenna.

Career

Club
Katrín made her debut for KR in the Úrvalsdeild kvenna, the top Icelandic league, on 9 May 2009 in a 1–1 home defeat to Valur at the age of 16 and 149 days. Two months later, on 3 July 2009, she scored her first professional goal in a 1:4 away defeat again against Valur. In 2012, she moved to Þór/KA. In 2015, she played one season for Klepp in the Norwegian top-tier league. In 2016, she signed with her current club, Stjarnan.

She sat out the 2019 season due to pregnancy. After playing for KR in 2020, Katrín returned to Stjarnan in 2021.

International
On 22 September 2007 Katrin debuted for Iceland U17 in a 3–0 away win over Ukraine. Between April 2009 and April 2011, she played 15 games with the U-19 national team and scored five goals. On 1 June 2013 Katrín debuted for the Iceland Senior Team in a 2–3 home defeat against Scotland, when she came as a substitute in the 90th minute for Hólmfríður Magnúsdóttir. On June 24, 2013, Katrín was included in the group called to represent Iceland at the UEFA Women's Euro 2013, however, on July 4, she was replaced by Soffía Arnþrúður Gunnarsdóttir. In 2017, again Katrín was called to represent her country in UEFA Women's Euro. This time, however, she not only went to the tournament but also played two matches, against France and Switzerland.

References

External links
 
 
 
 

1992 births
Living people
Katrin Asbjornsdottir
Katrin Asbjornsdottir
Women's association football midfielders
Katrin Asbjornsdottir
Katrin Asbjornsdottir
Katrin Asbjornsdottir
Katrin Asbjornsdottir
Expatriate footballers in Norway
Klepp IL players
Toppserien players
Katrin Asbjornsdottir
UEFA Women's Euro 2017 players